Diocese of Delhi may refer to:

 Delhi Orthodox Diocese
 Roman Catholic Archdiocese of Delhi
 Diocese of Delhi (Church of North India)